Rakaŭskaje pradmieście — the historic district of Minsk (Belarus), located along the ancient road to Rakaŭ. Here was the Uniate Church, Carmelite monastery and the  Church of St. Mary Magdalene, Orthodox monastery and the Church of the Holy Apostles Peter and Paul. During the Nazi occupation, part of the district was part of the Minsk ghetto.

To the west of Rakaŭskaje pradmiescie is Ramanaŭskaja Slabada, in the north - Tatarskaja Slabada (Piatnickaje pradmiescie), in the east - Zamčyšča, in the south - Nizki Rynak.

References

External links 
 

Geography of Minsk